Christianity is the largest religion in Norway. Norway has historically been called a Christian country. A majority of the population are members of the Church of Norway with 64.9% of the population officially belonging to the Evangelical Lutheran Church of Norway in 2021. At numerous times in history, Norway sent more missionaries per capita than any other country. This changed considerably from the 1960s. In 2004, only 12% of the population attended church services each month. Citizens born in Norway to one or two Norwegian parents are automatically added to the list of Protestant Christians in Norway, and are required to "sign out" of the church. Norwegian citizens' tax funds are given to the Protestant Church until one registers as a member of another religious group, or as a member of the Humanist association.

In 1993, there were 4,981 churches and chapels in Norway.

Christianization 

The conversion of Norway to Christianity began well before 1000 AD. The raids on Ireland, Britain and the Frankish kingdoms had brought the Vikings in touch with Christianity. Haakon the Good of Norway who had grown up in England tried to introduce Christianity in the tenth century, but had met resistance from pagan leaders and soon abandoned the idea.

Anglo-Saxon missionaries from England and Germany engaged in converting Norwegians to Christianity, but with limited success. However, they succeeded in converting Olaf I of Norway to Christianity. Olaf II of Norway (later Saint Olaf) had more success in his efforts to convert the population, and he is credited with Christianising Norway.

The Christians in Norway often established churches or other holy sites at places that had previously been sacred under the Norse religion. The spread of conversion can be measured by burial sites as Pagans were buried with grave goods while Christians were not. Christianity had become well established in Norway by the middle of the 11th century and had become dominant by the middle of the 12th century. Stave churches were built of wood without the use of nails in the 13th century.

By county 

The above numbers reflect the percentage of the population that are members of a church, typically from being baptized as infants. According to study collected on a sample of 706 Less than half of these define themselves as Christian.

Compared with other countries

Church attendance 

As of the early 21st century, Norway has one of the lowest church attendance rates in the world. Below is a table that compares Norway with other governmental divisions in regular church attendance for the early 21st century (2004–2006). In contrast to 250,000 regular churchgoers in the whole of Norway in 2004, 43,500 attend Lakewood Church in the United States each week, and 23,000 attend Hillsong Church in Australia each week.

The U.S. state of Alabama has a population roughly equal to that of Norway, but church attendance in Alabama is as much as 11 times higher than in Norway.

Importance of religion 

Below is a table that compares Norway with other countries in importance of religion.

Public opinion

World Values Survey

Other

Denominations

Statistics Norway

The Association of Religion Data Archives

Operation World 2001

Protestantism

Lutheranism

Church of Norway 

The church confesses the Lutheran Christian faith. It has as its foundation the Christian Bible, the Apostles' Creed, Nicene Creed, Athanasian Creed, Luther's Small Catechism and the Augsburg Confession. The Church is a member of the Porvoo Communion with 12 other churches, among them the Anglican Churches of Europe. It has also signed some other ecumenical texts, including the Joint Declaration on the Doctrine of Justification with the Catholic Church and the Joint statement on the occasion of the Joint Catholic-Lutheran Commemoration of the Reformation in the city of Lund, Sweden in 2016.

The constitutional head of the Church is the King of Norway, who is obliged to profess the Lutheran faith.  The Church of Norway is subject to legislation, including its budgets, passed by the Norwegian parliament, the Storting, and its central administrative functions are carried out by the Royal Ministry of Culture and Church Affairs.

The Church has a congregational and episcopal structure, with 1,284 parishes, 106 deaneries and 11 dioceses, namely:
 Oslo, seated in Oslo, also covers Asker and Bærum (Bishop Ole Christian Kvarme)
 Borg, seated in Fredrikstad covering areas southeast of Oslo (Bishop Helga Haugland Byfuglien)
 Hamar, seated in Hamar covering most of the inland areas north and east of Oslo (Bishop Solveig Fiske)
 Tunsberg, seated in Tønsberg covering coastal areas just southwest of Oslo and inland northwest (Bishop Laila Riksaasen Dahl)
 Agder og Telemark, seated in Kristiansand covering Southeastern Norway (Bishop Olav Skjevesland)
 Stavanger, seated in Stavanger covering Southwestern Norway (Bishop Erling Pettersen)
 Bjørgvin, seated in Bergen covering parts of Western Norway (Bishop Halvor Nordhaug)
 Møre, seated in Molde covering northern parts of Western Norway (Bishop Ingeborg Midttømme)
 Nidaros, seated in Trondheim, covering Trøndelag (Bishop Tor Singsaas)
 Sør-Hålogaland, seated in Bodø, covering southern areas of Northern Norway (Bishop Tor Berger Jørgensen)
 Nord-Hålogaland, seated in Tromsø, covering the rest of Northern Norway (Bishop Per Oskar Kjølaas)

The following membership numbers are from Statistics Norway's data from 2016 to 2020:

Evangelical Lutheran Free Church of Norway 

The Evangelical Lutheran Free Church of Norway ( in Norwegian) or the Free Church as it is commonly known, is a nationwide Lutheran free church in Norway consisting of 81 congregations with 19,313 members in 2020, up from 18,908 in 2016. It was founded in 1877 in Moss. It should not be confused with the Church of Norway, though both churches are members of the Lutheran World Federation. The Free Church is financially independent.

The Swedish Church in Norway 

13,108 members in 2020, down from 21,689 in 2016.

Mission Covenant Church of Norway 

11,223 members in 2020, up from 10,598 in 2016.

Brunstad Christian Church 

8,726 members in 2020, up from 8,177 in 2016.

The Finnish Evangelical Lutheran Congregation 

2,180 members in 2020, down from 4,117 in 2016.

Free Evangelical Congregations 

3,127 members in 2020, down from 3,318 in 2016.

Christian Centres 

2,968 members in 2020, down from 3,001 in 2016.

The Evangelical Lutheran Church Community 

3,139 members in 2020, down from 3,177 in 2016.

The Icelandic Evangelical Lutheran Congregation in Norway 

6,008 members in 2020, down from 6,830 in 2016.

The Christian Community 

2,428 members in 2020, down from 2,550 in 2016.

Other Protestant

Pentecostal Congregations 

40,725 members in 2020, up from 39,431 in 2016.

The Norwegian Baptist Union 

10,823 in 2020, up from 10,367 in 2016.

Adventists 

4,642 in 2020, down from 4,778 in 2016.

Anglicanism

The Methodist Church in Norway 
10,000 in 2020, down from 10,531 in 2016.

Catholic Church 

The Catholic Church in Norway is part of the worldwide Catholic Church, under the spiritual leadership of the Pope and the Curia in Rome. Per 1 January 2020 the church had 165,254 registered members. The number has more than doubled since 2010 from approximately 67,000 members, mainly due to high immigration. There may be approximately 170,000–200,000 people of Catholic background in the country, most of them immigrants.

The country is divided into three Church districts – the Diocese of Oslo and the prelatures of Trondheim and Tromsø and 32 parishes. The Bishop of Oslo participates in the Scandinavian Bishops Conference. The Catholic Church in Norway is as old as the kingdom itself, dating from approximately 900 A.D., with the first Christian monarchs, Haakon I from 934.

At first, the bulk of Catholic immigrants came from Germany, the Netherlands, and France. Immigration from Chile, the Philippines, and from a wide range of other countries began in the 1970s. This development has further increased in the last few years with economic immigrants from Poland and Lithuania. Ethnic Norwegian Catholics are now greatly outnumbered by the immigrants, although the former tend to be far more observant and conservative, being a self-selected group largely of ex-Lutheran converts.

Orthodoxy

Eastern Orthodoxy 
28,544 in 2020, up from 20,202 in 2016. The Orthodox Church has experienced a 235% increase in membership from 2010 to 2020.

Oriental Orthodoxy

Other Christian

Restorationism 

Jehovah's Witnesses

Jehovah's Witnesses is the largest nontrinitarian religious organization in Norway, with a membership of 12,661 in 2020, up from 12,413 in 2016. A branch office is located in Ytre Enebakk. Jehovah's Witnesses receive public grants in the same manner as other registered religious communities in Norway.

Mormonism

See also 

 Religion in Norway

References

External links 
 Statistics Norway – 430,000 members in religious and life stance communities
 Store Norske Leksikon – Norwegian